札幌コンテンポラリー (English: Contemporary Sapporo) is the tenth studio album by the American electronic musician Vektroid under the  alias 情報デスクVIRTUAL (English: Virtual Information Desk), released on April 20, 2012 by the independent record label Beer on the Rug. Contemporary Sapporo is one of Vektroid's most popular albums. The album was uploaded to both Beer on the Rug and Vektroid's Bandcamp pages.

Track listing

Notes
 The track "三更" is labeled as untitled on the Beer On The Rug release.

References

Vektroid albums
2012 albums